Soliclymenia is a genus of ammonites from the Late Devonian. S. paradoxa has an unusual, triangularly-coiled shell. Additional genera of ammonites with triangular shells are Kamptoclymenia, Trigonoshumardites, and Trigonogastrioceras. Soliclymenia semiparadoxa, which is known only from the holotype, is semi-triangular, the innermost whorls being circular. Other species of this genus, including S. solarioides and S. recticostata, have a circularly-coiled shell.

References 

 Fossils (Smithsonian Handbooks) by David Ward
 Korn et al. 2005 Acta Geologica Polonica 55:99-108.

External links 
 Soliclymenia in the Paleobiology Database

Ammonite genera
Clymeniina
Devonian ammonites
Late Devonian ammonites
Fossils of Poland